Wesson Attendance Center is a K12 school in Wesson, Mississippi.

Background
Wesson Attendance Center is one of four schools that make up the Copiah County School District.

Athletics
In 2007 students at this high school won the 2A state golf championship.

Gender discrimination lawsuit
In 2009, an honor student named Ceara Sturgis submitted a photograph of herself wearing a tuxedo for the senior yearbook. School officials told her that her picture was inappropriate on the basis of her clothing not matching her gender. The school chose to exclude Sturgis from the yearbook. Sturgis claims that she was removed from the yearbook because she is a lesbian. She alleged that the school discriminated against her.

The ACLU filed a lawsuit against the school district on behalf of Sturgis. Sturgis graduated from Wesson Attendance Center in May 2010. In December 2011, the ACLU settled the lawsuit after the school district agreed to require all students to pose in caps and gowns for the yearbook.

References

External links

Public high schools in Mississippi
Schools in Copiah County, Mississippi